José Buchs (1896–1973) was a screenwriter and film director.

Selected filmography
 The Moorish Queen (1922)
 Poor Valbuena (1923)
 Diego Corrientes (1924)
 The Grandfather (1925)
 A Famous Gentleman (1943)

References

Bibliography
 de España, Rafael. Directory of Spanish and Portuguese film-makers and films. Greenwood Press, 1994.

External links

1896 births
1973 deaths
Spanish film directors
Spanish male screenwriters
People from Santander, Spain
20th-century Spanish screenwriters
20th-century Spanish male writers